Nightride and Sunrise is a single-movement tone poem for orchestra written in 1908 by the Finnish composer Jean Sibelius. Sibelius gave different accounts of the inspiration for this music. One, told to Karl Ekman, was that it was inspired by his first visit to the Colosseum in Rome, in 1901. Another account, given in his later years to his secretary Santeri Levas, was that the inspiration was a sleigh ride from Helsinki to Kerava "at some time around the turn of the century", during which he saw a striking sunrise.

Orchestration
Sibelius scored the work for piccolo, 2 flutes, 2 oboes, 2 clarinets, bass clarinet, 2 bassoons, contrabassoon, 4 horns (doubled if possible in the Sunrise), 2 trumpets, 3 trombones, tuba, timpani, bass drum, snare drum, tambourine, triangle and strings.

Background
Sibelius completed the score by November 1908 and sent the manuscript to Alexander Siloti, who conducted the first performance, in Saint Petersburg, in 1909. The reviews of the first performance were unfavorable, except for one in Novy Russ, and one reviewer called Siloti's conducting "slack and monotonous". A writer for Novoye Vremya asked, "Who is actually riding, and why?" Siloti had made cuts to the score.

The work represents a subjective, spiritual experience of nature by "an ordinary man." It unfolds in three contrasting parts: a galloping section whose length and dogged determination produce one of Sibelius's strangest utterances; a brief hymnic transition in the strings; and an exquisite Northern sunrise whose first rays emerge in the horns.

A typical performance takes about fourteen minutes.

Recordings
In July 1956, the piece was recorded by Sir Adrian Boult and the London Philharmonic Orchestra.

References

Sources

External links 
 
 On-line biography of Jean Sibelius, "Inner voices 1908-1914".

Symphonic poems by Jean Sibelius
1908 compositions